Dai Hung oilfield (Mỏ Đại Hùng in Vietnamese) is an oil field in the block 05.1 belong to northwest of Nam Con Son Basin, Vietnamese offshore, South China Sea. This field is discovered in 1988, estimated the reserve of petroleum about  oil;  of natural gas and  condensate with the probability of 50%.

References 

Oil fields in Vietnam